The Stolen Sweets are an American Jazz group from Portland, Oregon. Formed in 2005, the group comprises vocalists Jen Bernard, Lara Michell and Erin Sutherland, Pete Krebs and David Langenes on guitar, and Keith Brush on double bass. They have released two albums so far: Shuffle Off to Buffalo (2006) and Sleepytime in Chinatown (2009).

The band have stated that they formed with the intention of emulating 1920s–1930s vocal jazz group The Boswell Sisters. As well as detecting influences from The Boswell Sisters, reviewers have also compared the band to Cab Calloway and Django Reinhardt.

Reviews of the band have been positive. OPBs show Oregon Art Beat praised the band's "high-energy shows" and "seamless harmonies". In a review of their album Sleepytime in Chinatown, the Jazz Society of Oregon praised its "impeccable harmonies" and "retro sound".

References

American swing musical groups
Musical groups established in 2005
Musical groups from Portland, Oregon
Swing revival ensembles
2005 establishments in Oregon